In the United Kingdom, the Firework Code (sometimes Firework safety code) is the name given to a number of similar sets of guidelines for the safe use of fireworks by the general public.

These include a thirteen-point guideline issued by the British government, a ten-point guide issued by the Royal Society for the Prevention of Accidents, a twelve-point guide from Cheshire Fire and Rescue Service, and a nine-point "firework safety code" from the London Fire Brigade.

See also 

 The Country Code
 The Highway Code

References 

Fireworks
Health and safety in the United Kingdom